Trosia nigrorufa is a moth of the family Megalopygidae. It was described by Francis Walker in 1865. It is found in Peru, Colombia and French Guiana.

References

Moths described in 1865
Megalopygidae